The Texas State Railroad is a historic  heritage railroad between Rusk and Palestine, Texas. Built by inmates, it was founded in 1883 by the state of Texas to haul raw materials for a smelter at the prison at Rusk. Regular service on the line was ended in 1921. The state leased the line to private companies until 1969, then turned it over to the Texas Parks and Wildlife Department in 1972. In 2007, the railroad was transferred to the Texas State Railroad Authority and is now operating as a scenic tourist line. It is currently operated on a limited, year-round schedule. Today, the railroad has a total of five steam locomotives (two of which are operational) and three diesel locomotives in their current roster. The Texas Legislature designated the Texas State Railroad as the official Railroad of Texas in 2003.

History
The start of the railroad dates back to 1883, with the completion of the Rusk Penitentiary in Rusk, Texas. Built with inmate labor, the original purpose of the railroad was to transport raw materials for the  iron smelter located at the Rusk Penitentiary. In 1906, the line reached Maydelle, and by 1909, the line was completed when it reached Palestine. The railroad grew and eventually expanded to freight and passenger service, but it was not profitable. Regular train service by the state ceased in 1921 and the line was leased to various railroad companies until 1969.

In 1972, the Texas Legislature turned the railroad over to the Texas Parks and Wildlife Department to be used as a state park. However, by 2006, the train cost the state of Texas $1 million per year more to maintain and to operate than the revenue from the park generated. Because of budget concerns, the Eightieth Texas Legislature (2007) passed Senate Bill 1659 which allowed for the creation of the Texas State Railroad Authority, and conveyed ownership of real estate and rolling stock to the Authority.  The RoW was leased to the Authority for 99 years.  The Authority leases operation of the line to qualified railroad operators.  On September 1, 2007, the Texas State Railroad Authority leased the operations of the TSR to American Heritage Railways, which also operates the Durango and Silverton Narrow Gauge Railroad in Colorado and the Great Smoky Mountains Railroad in North Carolina. In August 2012, American Heritage Railways abandoned the lease and Iowa Pacific Holdings leased operations. In addition to continuing passenger operations, Iowa Pacific Holdings opened the track to the main line in Palestine on November 1, 2012 to begin offering freight services.  The Western Group replaced Iowa Pacific Holdings as operator in May 2017 and was in turn replaced by Jaguar Transport Holdings of Joplin, Missouri in November 2020.

The leading supporters of keeping the railroad operational are State Senator Robert Nichols, along with State Representative Cody Harris. 

The schedule of the railroad allows visitors to ride trains pulled by antique diesel and steam locomotives between the park's Victorian-style depots and through the forests of East Texas. The railroad also has a long history of film and television productions, such as episodes of NBC's Revolution.

Motive power
The Texas State Railroad operates a steam locomotive and two diesel locomotives, with build dates ranging from 1901 to 1958:

Currently rostered locomotives

Formerly rostered locomotives

Texas & Eastern Railroad
In September of 2012, the Surface Transportation Board approved an operating agreement between the Texas State Railroad Authority and the Rusk, Palestine & Pacific Railroad (RP&P) for the latter to perform common carrier freight service over the Rusk-to-Palestine line using the RP&P name.  In May of 2017, the line was leased to the Texas & Eastern Railroad to carry on the freight services,  the RP&P being dissolved in January of 2018.  The freight trains bear the Texas & Eastern name, but the passenger excursions continue to operate under the Texas State Railroad name.  

The Texas & Eastern interchanges with the Union Pacific at Palestine, and carries primarily construction aggregates, industrial products and chemicals.

See also

List of heritage railroads in the United States

References

External links

Official website
Texas State Railroad Society
HawkinsRails' Texas State Railroad scrapbook
Jaguar Transport Holdings

Heritage railroads in Texas
Transportation in Cherokee County, Texas
Transportation in Anderson County, Texas
Railway companies established in 1881
Tourist attractions in Cherokee County, Texas
Tourist attractions in Anderson County, Texas
1881 establishments in Texas